Orit Rozin is an Israeli historian. She is a professor of Jewish history at the University of Tel Aviv.
 
Donna Robinson Divine, writing in The New Rambler in 2016, described Rozin as "one of a new generation of scholars building their careers around an exploration of Israel's social, cultural and political history."

Books
 Duty and Love: Individualism and Collectivism in 1950s Israel (Chaim Weizmann Institute for the Study of the History of Zionism and Israel at Tel Aviv University/Am Oved, 2008)
 The Rise of the Individual in 1950s Israel: A Challenge to Collectivism (Brandeis University/University Press of New England, 2011)
 A Home for All Jews: Citizenship, Rights and National Identity in the Young Israeli State (Brandeis University/University Press of New England, 2016)

References

External links
Official website

Historians of Israel
Historians of Jews and Judaism
Israeli historians
Academic staff of Tel Aviv University
Year of birth missing (living people)
Living people